Allister Brimble is a British video game music composer. He began composing music and sound effects for the video game industry in the mid-1980s. He also produced various audio tracks, as "Brimble's Beats", that were distributed on cover disks of magazines including CU Amiga and Amiga Format.

Brimble works as a freelance musician and sound designer for the games and console industry, and used to work alongside colleague Anthony Putson at the now defunct Orchestral Media Developments. He wrote the theme tune for an indoor theme park in Abu Dhabi. Brimble's extensive experience in alternative formats allowed him to compose for many gaming platforms.

Games

Brimble has contributed to a multitude of games spanning many formats, including:

 Andro Dunos II (2022)
 The Driver Syndicate (2020)
Overload (2018)
 Transport Fever (2016)
 Cartoon Network: Battle Crashers (2016), for the PlayStation 4, Xbox One, Nintendo 3DS, and Nintendo Switch
 Prison Architect (2015), for the Xbox One and PlayStation 4
 The Smurfs (2015), for the Nintendo 3DS
 The Smurfs (2011)
 Goat Simulator (2015), for the Xbox One and Xbox 360
 Frozen Synapse Prime (2014)
 Train Fever (2014)
 Teenage Mutant Ninja Turtles (2013), for the Nintendo 3DS
 Bratz Fashion Boutique (2013)
 Katsuma Unleashed (2013)
 Pro Foosball (2013)
 Fluidity: Spin Cycle (2012)
 Moshi Monsters: Moshlings Theme Park (2012)
 Imagine Fashion World 3D (2012)
 Bejeweled 3 (2012), for the Nintendo DS
 Tofu Collection (2012)
 Lets Ride! Best In Breed 3D (2012)
 Pets Paradise Resort 3D (2011)
 Gogo's Crazy Bones (2011)
 Dagedar (2011)
 Harry Potter and the Deathly Hallows – Part 2 (2011), for the Nintendo DS
 Einstein’s Brain Power (2011)
 Hop  (2011)
 Fluidity (2010)
 SteamWorld Tower Defense (2010)
 Sonic & Sega All-Stars Racing (2010), for the Nintendo DS
 Bakugan Battle Trainer (2010)
 Disney's A Christmas Carol for Nintendo DS (2009)
 I`m A Celebrity…Get Me Out Of Here! (2009), for the Nintendo DS
 Planet 51 (2009), for the Nintendo DS
 Petz Pony Beauty Pageant (2009)
 Take A Break`s: Puzzle Master (2009)
 Overlord: Minions (2009)
 Need for Speed: Undercover (2008), for the PlayStation 2, Wii, PlayStation Portable
 My Pet Pony (2008)
 1 vs. 100 (2008)
 Mes Gallops 3D (2008)
 Lets Play Mum (2008)
 Lets Play Shops (2008)
 Lets Play Schools (2008)
 Football Director DS (2008)
 Puzzler Collection (2008)
 My Horse & Me 2 (2008), for the Nintendo DS
 TrackMania Turbo (DS) (2008)
 Race Driver: Grid (2008), for the Nintendo DS
 Fort Boyard. Le Jeu (2008), for the Nintendo DS
 Koh-Lanta (2008)
 New International Track & Field (2008)
 Arctic Tale (2007), for the Game Boy Advance
 Deviens Miss France (2007)
 Code De La Route Edition 2008  (2007)
 Best Of Card Games (2007)
 Best Of Board Games (2007)
 Backyard Hockey (2007), for the Nintendo DS
 Backyard Basketball 2007 (2007), for the Nintendo DS
 Backyard Baseball (2007), for the Nintendo DS
 Clive Barker's Jericho (2007), for the PlayStation 3 and Xbox 360
 My Horse & Me (2007), for the Nintendo DS
 Kid Paddle: Blorks Invasion (2007)
 Asterix at the Olympic Games (2007), for the Nintendo DS
 Di-Gata Defenders (2007), for the Nintendo DS
 Dead 'n' Furious (2007)
 Arthur and the Invisibles (2007), for the Game Boy Advance
 Deal or No Deal (2006), for the Nintendo DS
 Alex Rider: Stormbreaker (2006), for the Game Boy Advance
 Garfield and His Nine Lives (2006)
 Xiaolin Showdown (video game) (2006), for the Nintendo DS
 Micro Machines V4 (2006), for the Nintendo DS
 Dance Factory (2006)
 Totally Spies! 2: Undercover (2006)
 Family Feud (2006), for the Game Boy Advance
 Go! Sudoku (2005)
 Asterix & Obelix XXL 2: Mission: Las Vegum (2005), for the Nintendo DS
 Bionicle: Maze of Shadows (2005)
 Noddy a Day In ToyLand (2005)
 Duel Masters - Shadow Of The Code (2005)
 Retro Atari Classics (2005)
 Kid Paddle (2005), for the Game Boy Advance
 Titeuf Mission Nadia (2005)
 Totally Spies! (2005)
 Driver 3 (2005), for the Game Boy Advance
 Backyard Basketball 2 (2004)
 Alien Hominid (2004), for the Game Boy Advance
 Lego Knights' Kingdom (2004)
 Hot Wheels: Stunt Track Challenge (2004)
 Need for Speed: Underground 2 (2004), for the Game Boy Advance and Nintendo DS
 Chris Sawyer's Locomotion (2004)
 Titeuf 2 (2004)
 Duel Masters: Sempai Legends (2004)
 Duel Masters: Kaijudo Showdown (2004)
 ¡Mucha Lucha! (2003), for the Game Boy Advance
 Sega Arcade Gallery (2003)
 Terminator 3: Rise of the Machines (2003), for the Game Boy Advance
 Stuntman (2003), for the Game Boy Advance
 Medal of Honor: Infiltrator (2003)
 Star Wars: Flight of the Falcon (2003)
 Pirates of the Caribbean (2003), for the Game Boy Advance
 Dr. Muto (2003), for the Game Boy Advance
 World Touring Car Rally (2003)
 Need for Speed: Underground (2003), for the Game Boy Advance
 He-Man: Power of Grayskull (2002)
 Steven Gerrard's Total Soccer (2002), for the Game Boy Advance
 Star Wars: Episode II – Attack of the Clones (2002)
 Fohlen Felix In Gefahr (2002)
 Egg Mania: Eggstreme Madness (2002)
 V-Rally 3 (2002), for the Game Boy Advance
 RollerCoaster Tycoon 2 (2002)
 XXX (2002), for the Game Boy Advance
 Colin McRae Rally 2.0 (2002), for the Game Boy Advance
 High Heat Major League Baseball 2002 (2002), for the Game Boy Color
 Mr. Nutz (2001), for the Game Boy Advance
 Robocop (2001), for the Game Boy Advance
 Planet Monsters (2001), for the Game Boy Advance
 Gremlins (2001), for the Game Boy Advance
 Star Wars Episode I: Jedi Power Battles (2001), for the Game Boy Advance
 DOOM (2001), for the Game Boy Advance
 The Italian Job (2001)
 Superman (2001), for the Game Boy Color
 Titeuf (2001), for the Game Boy Color
 Colin McRae Rally (2001), for the Game Boy Color
 Hot Potato (2001)
 Tony Hawk's Pro Skater 3 (2001), for the Game Boy Color
 Mat Hoffman's Pro BMX (2001), for the Game Boy Advance
 Extreme Ghostbusters (2001), for the Game Boy Color
 102 Dalmatians: Puppies to the Rescue (2000), for the Game Boy Color
 007 Racing (2000)
 Chicken Run (2000), for the Game Boy Color
 The Dukes of Hazzard (2000), for the Game Boy Color
 Cool Bricks (2000), for the Game Boy Color
 Toobin' (2000), for the Game Boy Color
 HydroSport Racing (2000)
 Driver 2 (2000)
 The Flintstones: Burgertime in Bedrock (2000)
 Road Rash (2000), for the Game Boy Color
 Olympics 2000 (2000), for the N64
 Jimmy White's 2: Cueball (2000)
 Carmageddon (2000), for the Game Boy Color
 Renegade Racers (2000)
 Lucky Luke (1999)
 Rat Attack! (1999)
 Casper (1999), for the Game Boy Color
 Driver (1999)
 RollerCoaster Tycoon (1999)
 Magical Drop (1999), for the Game Boy Color
 Abomination: The Nemesis Project (1999)
 Cutthroats: Terror on the High Seas (1999)
 Gangsters: Organized Crime (1998)
 Ghosts 'n Goblins (1998), for the Game Boy Color
 Three Lions (1998)
 Glover (1998), unreleased soundtrack rejected by the publisher
 Bubble Bubble 2 (1998), for the PlayStation
 Monster Trucks (1997)
 Toy Story (1996), for the SNES
 Descent II (1996)
 Wrath Of Earth (1996)
 Grand Prix Manager 2 (1996)
 X-COM: Terror from the Deep (1996)
 Crazy Bus (1996)
 Zeewolf 2: Wild Justice (1996)
 Pinocchio (1996)
 Worms (1996), for the SNES
 Subwar 2050 (1995), for the Amiga
 The Lion King (1995), for the Amiga and PC
 Descent (1995)
 Asterix & Obelix (1995)
 Screamer (1995)
 ATR: All Terrain Racing (1995)
 Kingpin (1995)
 Sid Meier's Colonization (1995), for the Amiga
 Boo! (1995), for the SNES (cancelled)
 Apache Gunship (1995)
 Super Loopz (1995)
 Road Runner (1995)
 X-COM: Enemy Unknown (1995), for the PlayStation
 Star Trek: 25th Anniversary (1994), for the Amiga
 Sensible Golf (1994)
 The Incredible Crash Dummies (1994)
 Dragon: The Bruce Lee Story (1994)
 Cannon Fodder (1994)
 Street Racer (1994)
 Alien Breed: Tower Assault (1994)
 Arcade Pool (1994)
 Ultimate Body Blows (1994)
 Mr Tuff (1994), for the SNES (cancelled)
 Tinhead (1994), for the SNES (cancelled)
 Zeewolf (1994)
 World Cup Striker (1994)
 Impossible Mission 2025 (1994)
 Bubble and Squeak (1994)
 World Cup Striker (Japan) (1994)
 Mortal Kombat II (1993), for the Amiga
 Dungeon Master II: The Legend of Skullkeep (1993)
 Dino Dini's Goal (1993)
 Noddy (1993)
 Alien Breed II: The Horror Continues (1993)
 Body Blows Galactic (1993)
 Overdrive (1993)
 The Lawnmower Man (1993)
 Slicks (1993)
 Seymour Goes To Hollywood (1993)
 Sergeant Seymour Robocop (1993)
 Superfrog (1993)
 Aladdin (1993), for MS-DOS
 Mortal Kombat (1992)
 Body Blows (1992)
 Project-X (1992)
 Assassin (1992)
 Indy Heat (1992)
 Dojo Dan (1992)
 Rampart (1992), C64 version only
 Murray Mouse (1992)
 Big Run (1992)
 Linus Spacehead (1992)
 Pro Baseball Simulator (1992)
 Big Nose Freaks Out (1992)
 Captain Dynamo (1992)
 Robin Hood Legend Quest (1992)
 Super Seymour (1992)
 Wild West Seymour (1992)
 Tom & Jerry (1992), for the SNES
 The Lost Vikings (1992)
 Slightly Magic (1991)
 Dizzy Prince of the Yolkfolk (1991)
 Dizzy Down the Rapids (1991)
 Spellbound Dizzy (1991)
 Full Contact (1991)
 Spacegun (1991)
 Pro Soccer Simulator (1991)
 Kamikaze (1991), not to be confused with Komai's game by the same name
 Super Seymour (1991)
 Road Riot (1991)
 1st Division Manager (1991)
 Tilt (1991)
 CJ In The USA (1991)
 Big Nose the Caveman (1991)
 CJ's Elephant Antics (1991)
 Terminator 2 (1991), for the Game Boy and Amiga
 Jimmy White's 'Whirlwind' Snooker (1991)
 Alien Breed (1991)
 The Hunt for Red October (1990)
 Dizzy Panic! (1990)
 Plexu (1990)
 Wonderland (1990)
 AMOS (1990)
 Liverpool (1990)
 Boomerang Kid (1990)
 Mean Machines (1990)
 The Sword And The Rose (1990)
 Italia 1990 (1990)
 Grand Prix Simulator (1990)
 MiG-29: Soviet Fighter (1989)
 Whacky Darts (1989)
 Terries Big Day Out (1989)
 Time Soldiers (1989), not to be confused with Alpha Denshi's game by the same name
 Fantasy World Dizzy (1989)
 Treasure Island Dizzy (1989)
 Nitro Boost Challenge (1989)
 Miami Chase (1989)
 Death Stalker (1989)
 By Fair Means or Foul (1989)
 Spellfire the Sorcerer (Wizard Willy) (1989)
 Rock Star Ate My Hamster (1988)
 Fastfood Dizzy (1987)
 Thunderbirds (1987)

Projects
In 2013, Brimble released a compilation, The Amiga Works (classic Amiga tunes), along with a remaster of his previous album Sounds Digital, and many other including The Spectrum Works, which includes some remasters of tunes from other artists.

References

External links
Allister Brimble's personal website
Allister Brimble's page at ExoticA with downloads for his Amiga Music and CD albums.
Artist profile at OverClocked ReMix

Interviews
"An Interview with Allister Brimble" Remix64: Carr, Neil (Jun. 13, 2001)
"Interview with Allister Brimble" Baker, Ben

Living people
Musicians from London
Video game composers
Year of birth missing (living people)